Asthawan is one of the 20 blocks located in Nalanda district in rural Bihar. According to the administration register, the block code of Asthawan is 373.

History
In December 2020 Asthawan approved as Nagar Panchayat by Bihar Government

Population

According to the 2011 census, the population here was about 14 thousand. At present the population of Asthawan Nagar panchayat is more than 17 thousand. Asthawan, Akbarpur, Soyvapar, Srichandpur, Amir Bigha, Gafoor Bigha, Tar Bigha and Nanhu Bigha villages come in this Nagar Panchayat

Language
Hindi and Urdu is the language spoken here

Education
Following colleges, schools and educational institutions are located here
 Government Polytechnic Asthawan, Nalanda
 Nalanda Institute of Technology & Management

References

Nalanda district